Balacra humphreyi is a moth of the  family Erebidae. It was described by Rothschild in 1912. It is found in the Democratic Republic of Congo, Ghana, Guinea, Nigeria, Sierra Leone and Uganda.

References

Balacra
Moths described in 1912
Erebid moths of Africa
Insects of the Democratic Republic of the Congo
Insects of West Africa